E. Michael Mitchell (1920 – September 6, 2009) was a Canadian-born artist reputed to be one of the few close friends of author J.D. Salinger and designer of the dust jacket for the first edition of Salinger's 1951 novel, Catcher in the Rye.

Career
Born in Toronto, Mitchell "planned to be an artist as soon as he realized he wasn’t going to be a hockey player", and attended the Royal College of Art in Ontario. While still a teenager early in World War II, perhaps fudging his age, he joined the Royal Air Force and flew combat missions over Britain during the German Blitz and later over German-occupied Europe, for which he was decorated and even touted on tour as a "hero"; Mitchell found that experience repellent and soon developed a determination - which he later expressed to J.D. Salinger - to "avoid the press at all costs".

Though still exhibiting watercolors in Canada in 1950, Mitchell had already moved from Toronto to the United States by the late 1940s, when he began illustrating articles for the "slick" magazines, Cosmopolitan, Collier's, Maclean's (Canada) and Women's Day, in an avant-garde style which was a striking departure from the "literal realism" of the period. Mitchell's illustrations first appeared in Cosmopolitan in June 1948, the same year in which two of Salinger's short stories were published in the magazine. His last known magazine contribution was to Collier's, July 25, 1953, a curious drawing of a cat and monkey as headpiece for Richard Stern's short story, Women In Conflict.

While Salinger was working on his now-famous book in 1950, he and Mitchell were "neighbors" in Westport, Connecticut and Salinger often visited the Mitchells' home, sometimes staying in their guest house to write, and often reading portions of the manuscript to Mitchell and his wife Esther. After Salinger moved to New Hampshire and became increasingly reclusive, he and Mitchell, then illustrating books and working as an instructor for the "Famous Artists School", began a correspondence that went on for more than forty years, though, periodically, there was also personal contact - Mitchell recalled being best man at Salinger's Vermont wedding to 21-year-old Claire Douglas in February 1955. Mitchell would later speak to Salinger of "our long and strangely gap-toothed friendship."

(When they had a falling out in the 1990s, Mitchell sold 14 of Salinger's letters to a book-dealer who placed them in the Morgan Library and Museum in New York. Finally put on public exhibition in 2010 after the author's death, the Salinger-Mitchell letters, dated between 1951 and 1995, were described by the Library as an "extraordinarily rare and revealing correspondence", which "richly document a period of Salinger’s life that has remained obscure and provide hitherto unknown details about the daily habits and thought of this legendary author.")

In the early 1970’s, Mitchell's illustrations were featured in Lithopinion, the graphic arts and public affairs journal of the Amalgamated Lithographers of America.  In 1973, Mitchell taught illustration students at Parsons School of Design in New York City. In 1974, he moved to Milan, Italy to work on a live-action/animated feature film called "It's Our World, Too" with songs dealing with ecological issues. He was in charge of the entire visual look of the film, with live-action sequences filmed at Pinewood Studios in London and animation work at Gamma Films in Milan. This experience was influential in his production design of the 1992 film FernGully: The Last Rainforest.

Mitchell, meanwhile, left his Westport "sagging barn" and New York Bowery studio in the late 1970s to begin a new career in southern California as a cartoonist and animation artist for Ruby-Spears Productions and Hanna-Barbera Productions, credited with working on some 20 television series and movies between 1978 and 1996, including Flash Gordon, Fat Albert and the Cosby Kids, Thundarr the Barbarian, Camp Candy, and FernGully: The Last Rainforest. Mitchell later remembered that his first animation experience was working on the 1968 Beatles movie, Yellow Submarine, but, if so, that work remains uncredited. In the last decade of his life - he died a year before Salinger - he was a popular instructor of Figure Drawing in the Character Animation School at the California Institute of the Arts in Valencia, California near Los Angeles. Mitchell (and some of his students) discussed his work in two posthumous student-made videos, "My Little WORLD-E. Michael Mitchell on colors & designs" (2011), Ben Adams, "Mike Mitchell, Life Drawing and Beyond (Parts 1 and 2, 2009)".

References

1920 births
2009 deaths
Artists from Toronto
20th-century Canadian painters
Canadian male painters
J. D. Salinger
Canadian expatriates in the United States